Jenny Higham  is the first woman to serve as Principal of St George's, University of London, which she took up appointment in November 2015. St George's, University of London obtained University status in June 2022, meaning Professor Higham's position is now Vice-Chancellor. She was the first female to be elected chair of the Medical Schools Council (August 2016). Higham is also an honorary consultant  at St. Georges NHS Foundation Trust and a visiting professor at the Imperial College London.

Higham was born in Warrington and also lived in Gloucestershire and Norfolk during her childhood. She undertook her secondary education at Thorpe Grammar School, Norwich.

Career 
Higham studied for her MBBS at University College London, graduating in 1985 with distinction. She received the Atchison Scholarship, which is an annual award presented by UCL to the student who showed the best work and greatest proficiency of the medicine graduating year. She undertook specialist training in Obstetrics and Gynaecology, obtaining her MRCOG in 1992 and FRCOG in 2005. In addition to clinical training, she worked towards a research higher degree, investigating the clinical association and treatment of menorrhagia, awarded by the University of London in 1993. She remains clinically active as a gynaecologist.

Higham has previously held senior positions at Imperial College London, including head of undergraduate medicine (2006–2009) and vice dean for institutional affairs and director of education for the Faculty of Medicine.

She led on Imperial College London's work to establish the Lee Kong Chian School of Medicine in Singapore, a partnership between Nanyang Technological University and Imperial, which opened in 2013. She then served as the school's senior vice-dean from 2013 to 2015. In recognition of her work, she was awarded the Nanyang Education University Gold Award, the Imperial College Medal (2014), and honoured as a Fellow of the Teaching Excellence Academy at Nanyang Technological University (2015).

Higham has received “Mentor of the Year” at the Women of the Future [WOF] Awards in 2011 and the Imperial College President and Rector's Award for Outstanding Contribution to Teaching Excellence in 2013.

She previously worked at St Mary's (now Imperial College Healthcare Trust), appointed as senior lecturer in obstetrics and gynaecology in 1997. Here, she contributed to the amalgamation of the curricula from the three medical schools (St Mary's, Charing Cross and Westminster) that merged to form the new medical school at Imperial College London.

Higham has sat on many boards, including: the Universities and Colleges Employers Association (UCEA) Clinical Academic Staff Advisory Group (2013–2015); the Higher Education North West London Board (2012–2015); and West Middlesex University Trust (2009–2015).

She has been involved with academic medical policy Medical Schools Council and has chaired the council's Education Sub-Committee (2015–16). She was treasurer until 2016, when she took the position of Chair from 2016-2019. She currently is on the Boards of St Georges University Hospital Foundation Trust, the South London Health Innovation Network and the General Medical Council's Education and Training Advisory Board. More recently Professor Higham has taken on the roles of Member of the board of Universities UK (UUK) (August 2019), Member of the board of the Universities & Colleges Employers Association (UCEA) (June 2019 - June 2023) and Board member University of London Institute of Paris (2018-2022). Professor Higham has also taken up new roles in the audit and risk committee of UUK and chairs the remuneration committee of UCEA.

She currently has a research interest in the use of advanced simulation in medical education. Her previous research publications have focused on reproductive medicine.

Higham delivered the Academy of Medical Educators’ Annual Calman Lecture 2017 and then accepted an Honorary Fellowship. In July 2018 Jenny Higham was awarded an Honorary Doctorate from Brighton and Sussex Medical School.  The previous month she was appointed as a Fellow of the Royal College of Physicians.

In May 2021 Jenny Higham was elected as Universities UK Funding Policy Lead. She will serve for three years from 1 August 2021 to 31 July 2024.

In July 2021 it was confirmed that Jenny Higham will sit on the London Higher Board of Trustees as a co-opted member.

In July 2022 Jenny Higham was confirmed as a member of the Government's R&D People and Culture Ministerial Coordination Group.

Professor Higham is also a Council member for the All-Party Parliamentary University Group, sitting until 2024.

References 

Living people
Vice-Chancellors by university in England
People associated with St George's, University of London
Year of birth missing (living people)
Alumni of University College London
Academics of Imperial College London
British gynaecologists
English women medical doctors
Women heads of universities and colleges
Fellows of the Royal College of Obstetricians and Gynaecologists
Fellows of the Royal College of Physicians
People from Warrington